WSKG-FM, 89.3 MHz FM, is an NPR member station in Binghamton, New York. It has an effective radiated power of 11.5 kW. Due to hilly terrain, the signal is repeated on several other frequencies located throughout South Central New York State.

WSKG-FM began broadcast in October 1975. Its operator WSKG Public Telecommunications Council is a cooperative non-profit of the State University of New York Board of Regents and New York State Department of Education.

The station's format had long been principally classical music, NPR talk radio programs, and NPR news, with jazz on Friday evenings after All Things Considered and various folk music played on Saturday evenings after A Prairie Home Companion. On February 3, 2019, WSKG shuffled programming so that WSKG-FM took on an all-NPR and BBC talk and news format.

WSKG-TV and WSQX-FM are other broadcast stations operated by the WSKG Public Telecommunications Council.

Simulcasts
WSKG-FM has five repeater stations to rebroadcast its programming

Translators

See also
 WIOX
 WSQX-FM

References

External links
 

 Other station data

NPR member stations
Public radio stations in the United States
SKG-FM
Radio stations established in 1975
1975 establishments in New York (state)